Philippe de Rémi may refer to:
Philippe de Rémi (died 1265) (1210–1265), poet and bailli, also Sire de Beaumanoir
Philippe de Rémi (died 1296) (1247–1296), his son, jurist and royal official